Alcoa Care-free Homes are a group of suburban homes designed for Alcoa (Aluminum Company of America) by Charles M. Goodman during the Mid-century modern movement, incorporating ideas generated at the Women's Congress On Housing.

While composed of a variety of building materials (brick, steel, wood, and extensive use of glass) they incorporated large amounts (up to 7500 lbs) of aluminum. The homes were introduced in 1957. They were constructed by local contractors using kits provided by Alcoa, and were mostly built in 1958 as model homes. The company had intended to build forty-eight homes, one for each state in union at the time. Eventually, twenty-four were built in sixteen states.

Locations
According to the original brochure, an Alcoa Care-Free Home was built in the following places:
 Lakewood, Colorado, (outside Denver)
 New Canaan, Connecticut
 Pinecrest, Florida (outside Miami)
 Evansville, Illinois
 Wheaton, Illinois
 Lafayette, Indiana - the first Alcoa house to be built
 Lincoln, Massachusetts (outside Boston
 Southfield, Michigan (outside Birmingham)
 Flint, Michigan
 Grand Rapids, Michigan
 Saint Louis Park, Minnesota (outside Minneapolis) restored
 Brighton, New York (outside Rochester ) - Alcoa Care-free Home added to the NRHP
 Brecksville, Ohio (outside Cleveland)
 Dublin, Ohio (outside Columbus)
 Woodbourne-Hyde Park, Ohio (outside Dayton)
 Perrysburg, Ohio (outside Toledo) - Built by Gustav H. Feldtmann, the house was open to visitors for a six-week period shortly after completion. He sold it in 1965. 
Raleigh Hills, Oregon (outside Portland) ) - The house was demolished in September 2021, after being sold for $880,000 in December 2020.
 Upper St. Clair Township (outside Pittsburgh) - in a southern suburb of Alcoa’s corporate home
 Ross Township, Allegheny County, Pennsylvania (outside Pittsburgh)
 Maryville, Tennessee
 Fort Worth, Texas
 Alexandria, Virginia (Hollin Hills Historic District) contributing property the NRHP historic district - restored
 Richmond, Virginia
 Seattle, Washington

See also
Lustron house
Charles M. Goodman House
Case Study Houses

References 

1957 in the United States
Alcoa
Aluminum in the United States
Houses in the United States